Easton is a city in Gregg and Rusk counties in the U.S. state of Texas. The population was 510 at the 2010 census, and 499 at the 2020 census.

"Easton, Texas" is the title of the fourth episode of the CBS Western television series Trackdown, starring Robert Culp as Texas Ranger Hoby Gilman. The episode aired on October 25, 1957. In the story line, a railroad official is robbed, and his head clerk played by Dabbs Greer, is mortally wounded.  Townspeople mistakenly consider the clerk a hero.

Easton is also briefly mentioned in the 1950s B movie The Giant Gila Monster.

Geography

Easton is located at  (32.386874, –94.585589), mostly in Gregg County.

According to the United States Census Bureau, the city has a total area of 2.5 square miles (6.4 km2).None of the area is covered with water.

Demographics

As of the 2020 United States census, there were 499 people, 163 households, and 120 families residing in the city.

Education
The Gregg County portion of Easton is served by the Longview Independent School District, while the Rusk County portion is served by the Tatum Independent School District.

References

Cities in Gregg County, Texas
Cities in Rusk County, Texas
Cities in Texas
Longview metropolitan area, Texas